A slipcase is a  five-sided box, usually made of high-quality cardboard, into which binders, books or book sets are slipped for protection, leaving the spine exposed. Special editions of books are often slipcased for a stylish appearance when placed on a bookshelf. A few publishers, such as the Folio Society, publish all their books in slipcases.

Protective slipcases may be issued for cassettes, compact discs or DVDs instead of or in addition to the more common jewel cases or DVD keep case, and may be chosen for aesthetic or economic reasons. Larger slipcases that are designed to house one or more jewel cases or DVD keep cases are often used in packaging for special edition releases of CDs or DVDs.

See also 
 Solander box

References

External links 
 

Publishing
Containers
Book design